KDBM (1490 AM) is a radio station licensed to serve Dillon, Montana.  The station is owned by Dead-Air Broadcasting Company. It airs a full-service Country music format.

The station was assigned the KDBM call letters by the Federal Communications Commission on April 1, 1988.

In addition to its usual music programming, the station carries selected local high school and college sporting events.

References

External links
FCC History Cards for KDBM 
KDBM official website

DBM
Country radio stations in the United States
Beaverhead County, Montana
Radio stations established in 1988